BFJ may refer to:

IATA code for Bijie Feixiong Airport
Battle Fever J, a Japanese TV series